is a subprefecture of Hokkaido Prefecture, Japan. It is the northernmost subprefecture of Japan.

Wakkanai Airport is located in Wakkanai. Rishiri Airport is located in Rishirifuji, Rishiri District.

Geography

Municipalities

Mergers

History 
1897: Sōya Subprefecture established; Sōya, Esashi, Rishiri, Rebun Districts placed under its jurisdiction
1948: Toyotomi village (now town), Teshio District transferred from Rumoi Subprefecture
2010: Horonobe town, Teshio District transferred from Rumoi Subprefecture

External links
 Official website

Subprefectures in Hokkaido